Rowing at the 2005 Southeast Asian Games took place in the La Mesa Dam, Novaliches Reservoir, Quezon City, Metro Manila, Philippines. The event was held from November 28 to December 1.

Medal table

Medalists

Men

Women

External links
Southeast Asian Games Official Results

2005 Southeast Asian Games events
Southeast Asian Games
2005